Matiatia is a location at the western end of Waiheke Island, in New Zealand's Hauraki Gulf. The name is used for both a valley and its surrounding hills, with the valley stretching down to a foreshore and wharf on the gulf. Matiatia is known as "The Gateway to Waiheke Island".

The Māori language name  is shared with a type of beach grass, now rare, which was known to grow at the gateway.

References

Populated places on Waiheke Island